The A485 is an A road linking Tanerdy near Carmarthen to Llanfarian near Aberystwyth in Wales.

Settlements along the route include:
Tanerdy
Peniel
Rhydargaeau
Pontarsais
Alltwalis
Gwyddgrug
New Inn
Gwndwn
Llanllwni
Abergiar
Llanybydder
Pencarreg
Lampeter
Llangybi
Tregaron
Bronant
Ffoshelyg
Lledrod
Llanilar
Llanfarian

Sources
Google Maps UK

Roads in Wales
Transport in Carmarthenshire
Transport in Ceredigion